Robert Chafe (born 1971) is a Canadian playwright and actor based in St. John's. He is the author of seventeen stage scripts and co-author of another eight. His play Afterimage won the Governor General's Award for English language drama at the 2010 Governor General's Awards. He was previously nominated for the same award at the 2004 Governor General's Awards for his plays Butler's Marsh and Tempting Providence.

His other plays have included Place of First Light (cowritten with Sean Panting), Charismatic Death Scenes, Belly Up, Emptygirl, Oil and Water, Isle des Demons, Lemons, One Foot Wet, Signals, Under Wraps and Vive La Rose. Belly Up was also published in the Breakwater Book of Contemporary Newfoundland Plays: Volume 3. In 2016, he published a book of short stories, Two-Man Tent. He has won numerous Newfoundland and Labrador Arts and Letters Awards, and was named 1998 Emerging Artist of the Year by the Newfoundland and Labrador Arts Council.

In 2018, Memorial University of Newfoundland awarded Chafe the degree of doctor of letters honoris causa “for his major contribution to Newfoundland theatre and culture.”

Chafe has acted, both on stage and in the 2006 television miniseries Above and Beyond. When Artistic Fraud of Newfoundland was formed in 1995, Chafe was an original cast member and, since 2000, has served as Artistic Director. Some of his first performances with Artistic Fraud were in the shows In Your Dreams, Freud; The Cheat; Jesus Christ Superstar; and Great Big Stick.

Early and personal life

Chafe is from Petty Harbour, Newfoundland. While there he attended Goulds elementary, McPherson Jr High and Bishops College. He and his three brothers were raised by William Robert Chafe (Petty Harbour, NL) who worked in the construction industry and Elizabeth Pynn (Carpoon, NL) who was a homemaker. He worked for his father's construction company until he was eighteen years old before joining the Elysian Theatre Company. He is openly gay.

Bibliography

Plays 

 Tempting Providence (2002)
 Isle of Demons (2004)
 Afterimage (2010)
 Fear of Flight (2010)
 Oil and Water (2011)
 Under Wraps (2014)
 The Colony of Unrequited Dreams (2015)
 Between Breaths (2018)

Short stories 

 Two-Man Tent (2016)

References 

1971 births
Living people
21st-century Canadian dramatists and playwrights
Male actors from Newfoundland and Labrador
Writers from St. John's, Newfoundland and Labrador
Canadian gay writers
Governor General's Award-winning dramatists
Memorial University of Newfoundland alumni
Canadian male stage actors
Canadian male television actors
Canadian LGBT dramatists and playwrights
Canadian male dramatists and playwrights
21st-century Canadian male writers
Writers from Newfoundland and Labrador
Canadian gay actors
Gay dramatists and playwrights
21st-century Canadian LGBT people